Monotrematum sudamericanum is an extinct monotreme species from the Paleocene (Peligran) Salamanca Formation in Patagonia, Argentina. It is the only monotreme found outside Oceania.

Taxonomy
A species described in 1992 and assigned to a new genus Monotrematum as the type. It is currently the only known species of the genus. The authors compared their fossil material to the genus Obdurodon, ornithorhynchid species first discovered at Australian fossil sites in 1975.

Description
Monotrematum sudamericanum is known only from two lower and one upper platypus-like teeth. It is the only known non-Australasian ornithorhynchid. The main difference, apart from continent and age, is its size: the teeth of Monotrematum are around twice as large as those of other similar species in the related genus Obdurodon. The teeth of M. sudamericanum presently reside in the collections of Museo de La Plata and Museo Paleontológico Egidio Feruglio, both in Argentina.

According to Pascual, "The preserved enamel in the central region shows that the crown pattern is almost identical to that of Obdurodon: it is composed of two V-shaped lobes, the anterior of which is wider, separated from the posterior one by a valley that connects the lingual and buccal sides of the crown separating the anterior and posterior lobes."

References

External links

 

Ornithorhynchidae
Prehistoric monotremes
Paleocene mammals of South America
Peligran
Paleogene Argentina
Fossils of Argentina
Fossil taxa described in 1992
Taxa named by Rosendo Pascual
Taxa named by Mike Archer (paleontologist)
Taxa named by Edgardo Ortiz Jaureguizar
Taxa named by Joyce Rodrigues do Prado
Taxa named by Henk Godthelp
Taxa named by Suzanne J. Hand
Prehistoric mammal genera
Golfo San Jorge Basin
Salamanca Formation